Megastomia desmiti is a species of sea snail, a marine gastropod mollusk in the family Pyramidellidae, the pyrams and their allies.

Distribution
This species occurs in the Atlantic Ocean off Mauritania.

References

 eñas A. & Rolán E., 1999. La familia Pyramidellidae Gray, 1840 (Mollusca, Gastropoda, Heterostropha) en Africa Occidental. 4. los géneros Megastomia, Odostomia, Noemiamea y Syrnola. Iberus, suplemento 5: 1-150

External links
 To Encyclopedia of Life
 To World Register of Marine Species

Pyramidellidae
Gastropods described in 1998
Invertebrates of West Africa